In mathematical group theory, a C-group is a group such that the centralizer of any involution has a normal Sylow 2-subgroup. They include as special cases CIT-groups where the centralizer of any involution is a 2-group, and TI-groups where any Sylow 2-subgroups have trivial intersection.

The classification of C-groups was used in Thompson's classification of N-groups.
The simple C-groups are 
the projective special linear groups PSL2(p) for p a Fermat or Mersenne prime
the projective special linear groups PSL2(9)
the projective special linear groups PSL2(2n) for n≥2
the projective special linear groups PSL3(q) for q a prime power
the Suzuki groups Sz(22n+1) for n≥1
the projective unitary groups PU3(q) for q a prime power

CIT-groups

The C-groups include as special cases the CIT-groups, that are groups in which the centralizer of any involution is a 2-group.

TI-groups

The C-groups include as special cases the TI-groups (trivial intersection groups), that are groups in which any two Sylow 2-subgroups have trivial intersection.

References

Finite groups